Strongyles (from the Greek strongulos, meaning round), or alternatively, strongyls, are nematode worms of the family Strongylidae, order Strongylida. They are often parasitic in the gastrointestinal tract of mammals, especially grazers such as sheep, cattle and horses.

Genera
Genera:
 Alocostoma Mawson, 1979
 Bidentostomum Tshoijo, 1957
 Borania Ricci, 1939
 Caballonema Abuladze, 1937
 Chabertiella Tadros, 1964
 Chapiniella Yamaguti, 1961
 Choniangium Henry & Bauche, 1914
 Codiostomum Railliet & Henry, 1911
 Coronocyclus Hartwich, 1986
 Craterostomum Boulenger, 1920
 Crycophorus Chaves, 1930
 Cyathostomum Molin, 1861
 Cylicocyclus Ihle, 1922
 Cylicodontophorus Ihle, 1922
 Cylicostephanus Ihle, 1922
 Cylindropharynx Leiper, 1911
 Decrusia Lane, 1914
 Dicerocola Round, 1962
 Equinurbia Lane, 1914
 Eucyathostomum Molin, 1861
 Gyalocephalus Looss, 1900
 Hsiungia K'ung & Yang, 1964
 Hudsonia Leroux, 1940
 Hypodontus Mönnig, 1929
 Javellia Ricci, 1939
 Khalilia Neveu-Lemaire, 1924
 Kiluluma Skrjabin, 1916
 Macropicola Mawson, 1978
 Macropostrongyloides Yamaguti, 1961
 Maplestonema Johnston & Mawson, 1939
 Murshidia Lane, 1914
 Neomurshidia Chabaud, 1957
 Oesophagodontus Railliet & Henry, 1902
 Oesophagostomoides Schwartz, 1928
 Oesophagostomum
 Paradoxostrongylus Özdikmen, 2010
 Paramacropostrongylus Johnson & Mawson, 1940
 Parapoteriostomum Hartwich, 1986
 Parastrongyloides Morgan, 1928
 Petrovinema Erschov, 1943
 Phascolostongylus
 Phascolostrongylus Canavan, 1931
 Poteriostomum Quiel, 1919
 Quilonia Lane, 1914
 Rhinocerotonema Jiang, Yin & Kung, 1986
 Sauricola Chapin, 1924
 Skladnikia Ricci, 1939
 Strongylus Müller, 1780
 Theileriana Monnig, 1924
 Tridentoinfundibulum Tschoijo, 1958
 Triodontophorus Looss, 1902
 Wuia K'ung, 1959
 Zebrincola Ricci, 1939

References

External links 
 
 uniprot

 
Nematode families
Parasitic nematodes of mammals
Parasites of equines
Veterinary helminthology